Wykin is a hamlet in the English county of Leicestershire.

Wykin is located to the north-west of the town of Hinckley and is separated from it by the A47 Northern Perimeter Road.

For the purposes of local government Wykin is part of the Hinckley and Bosworth borough with the population being included in the Hinckley- Trinity ward of the borough.

Hamlets in Leicestershire
Hinckley and Bosworth